Kilombero District is a district in Morogoro Region, south-western Tanzania.

The district is situated in a vast floodplain, between the Kilombero River in the south-east and the Udzungwa-Mountains in the north-west. On the other side of the Kilombero River, in the south-east, the floodplain is part of Ulanga District.

According to the last census in 2002, the population of Kilombero District is 321,611  
The main ethnic groups are Wapogoro, Wandamba, Wabena, and Wambunga and several others in small proportions.

The area is predominantly rural with the semi-urban district headquarters Ifakara as major settlement.

The majority of the villagers are subsistence farmers of maize and rice. There are large plantations of teak wood in the Kilombero and the neighbouring Ulanga districts. In the north-west of the district, Illovo Sugar Company's sugar-cane plantations occupy most of the low lying area.

Administrative subdivisions

Constituencies
For parliamentary elections, Tanzania is divided into constituencies. As of the 2010 elections Kilombrero District had one constituency:
 Kilombrero Constituency

Divisions
Ifakara, Kidatu, Mang´ula, Mlimba, Mngeta.

Wards

NGOs
 MSABI – Safe Water for Better Health Ifakara – an NGO that focuses on water, sanitation, hygiene, and education
 Eye Care Foundation
 Friends of Kilombero
 TFCG – works on natural forest management and related natural resources management in Tanzania Eastern Arc mountain blocks and coastal forests
 Save Education and Future Development Foundation – promotes access of quality education in rural communities

References

Districts of Morogoro Region
Floodplains of Africa
Wetlands of Tanzania